Paley may refer to:

People
 Albert Paley (born 1944), a modernist American metal sculptor
 A. G. V. Paley, British army officer and first Chief of the Defence Staff of Ghana
 Edward Paley (1823–1895), Lancaster architect 
 Frederick Apthorp Paley (1815–1888), English classical scholar
 Grace Paley (1922–2007), writer and peace activist
 Henry Paley (1859–1946), Lancaster architect, son of Edward
 Maureen Paley (born 1953), an American art dealer, based in London, England
 Nina Paley American cartoonist, animator and free culture activist
 Princess Olga Paley, second wife of Grand Duke Paul Alexandrovich of Russia
 Raymond Paley (1907–1933), mathematician
 Reid Paley, musician
 Vladimir Paley (1897–1918), Russian poet, son of Olga
 William Paley (1743–1805), Christian apologist and philosopher
 William S. Paley (1901–1990), broadcaster

Other uses
 Paley, Seine-et-Marne, a commune of the Seine-et-Marne département, in France
 Paley Street, a village in Berkshire

Surnames of Old English origin